The Jamaican order of precedence is as follows:

Charles III, King of Jamaica
Governor-General of Jamaica (Sir Patrick Allen)
Prime Minister of Jamaica (Andrew Holness)
Deputy Prime Minister (Horace Chang)
Members of the Cabinet and Ministers of State
Leader of the Opposition (Mark Golding)
President of the Senate (Tom Tavares-Finson, KC)
Speaker of the House of Representatives (Marisa Dalrymple-Philibert)
Chief Justice of Jamaica, Bryan Sykes; President of the Court of Appeal
President of the Jamaica Council of Churches
Attorney General (Derrick McKoy)
Head of the Civil Service, Head of the Foreign Service, Ambassadors, High Commissioners, Head of the European Union delegation, Ministers, Envoys
Parliamentary Secretaries
Members of the Privy Council
Judges of the Court of Appeal and the Supreme Court
Deputy President of the Senate
Deputy Speaker of the House of Representatives
Members of the Senate
Members of the House of Representatives
Mayors and Chairmen of Parish Councils (except on municipal occasions, when they take precedence immediately after the Prime Minister)
Chief of Staff of the Jamaica Defence Force; Commissioner of Police
Custodes of Parishes
Governor of the Bank of Jamaica, Financial Secretary, Auditor General, Permanent Secretaries, Director of Public Prosecutions, Solicitor General, Chairman of the Public Service Commission
Heads of International Organisations 
Vice-Chancellor of the University of the West Indies
Chairman and Secretaries of the Political Parties having representation in Parliament 

A slightly different version of the Order of Precedence is given on the website of the Office of the Prime Minister of Jamaica:

Governor-General of Jamaica (Sir Patrick Allen)
Prime Minister of Jamaica (Andrew Holness)
Deputy Prime Minister (Horace Chang)
Leader of the Opposition (Peter Phillips)
Members of the Cabinet; President of the Senate; Speaker of the House of Representatives
Former Governors-General and former Prime Ministers
Chief Justice of Jamaica; President of the Court of Appeal
Ministers of State
President of the Jamaica Council of Churches
Widows and Widowers of National Heroes; Widows and Widowers of former Governors-General; Widows and Widowers of former Heads of Government 
Attorney-General (Derrick McKoy)
Cabinet Secretary (Head of the Civil Service)
Head of the Foreign Service; Dean of the Diplomatic Corps; Ambassadors and High Commissioners; Head of Delegation of the European Union; Secretary-General of the International Seabed Authority
Members of the Privy Council
Deputy President of the Senate
Deputy Speaker of the House of Representatives
Members of the Senate; Members of the House of Representatives
Judges of the Court of Appeal; Judges of the Supreme Court
Chairman of the Public Service Commission
Chief of Staff of the Jamaica Defence Force; Commissioner of Police
Mayors and Chairmen of Parish Councils (except on municipal occasions, when they take precedence immediately after the Prime Minister)
Custodes of Parishes
Chief of State Protocol
Resident Representative or Resident Coordinator of the United Nations Development Programme; Heads of Offices of International Organisations; Consuls-General; Members of the Consular Corps 
Vice-Chancellor of the University of the West Indies
Chairman and Secretaries of the Political Parties having representation in Parliament

References

External links
Jamaican order of precedence

Government of Jamaica
Politics of Jamaica
Orders of precedence